Gomirje is a settlement in north-western Croatia, situated at the far east of the mountainous region of Gorski kotar in the Primorje-Gorski Kotar County. It is part of the Vrbovsko municipality. The population is 343 (as of the 2011 census).

Demographics

Sights
 Gomirje Monastery - the westernmost Serb Orthodox monastery

Notable natives and residents
 Lazar Mamula (1795-1878) - baron, general in the general in Austro-Hungarian army and governor of Dalmatia
 Bogdan Mamula (1918-2002) -  antifascist, partisan and People's Hero of Yugoslavia
 Desanka Đorđević (1927-2011) - dancer and folk dance choreographer in the National Ensemble of Folk Dances and Songs of Serbia, Ensemble "Kolo"

References

Populated places in Primorje-Gorski Kotar County
Serb communities in Croatia